The Central Committee of the 23rd Congress of the Communist Party of the Soviet Union was in session from 1966 until 1971. There were 195 regular members chosen, an increase from the 175 selected in 1961; of the 195 members, 51 were newcomers, and 144 were incumbents; another 31 had died or resigned since the 1961 election.  Another 145 candidate members, who could participate but could not vote on motions, were picked in addition to the voting regular members.

The Committee elected, at its 1st Plenary Session, the 23rd Politburo, the 23rd Secretariat and the 23rd Party Control Committee of the Communist Party of the Soviet Union.

Plenums
The Central Committee was not a permanent institution. It convened plenary sessions. 16 CC plenary sessions were held between the 23rd Congress and the 24th Congress. When the CC was not in session, decision-making power was vested in the internal bodies of the CC itself; that is, the Politburo and the Secretariat. None of these bodies were permanent either; typically they convened several times a month.

Composition

Members

Candidates

References

Citations

Bibliography
 

Central Committee of the Communist Party of the Soviet Union
1966 establishments in the Soviet Union
1971 disestablishments in the Soviet Union